Selective vehicle detection is, or was, the name of a bus priority system used by London Buses to allow traffic signals to selectively favour buses' movement through intersection by changing traffic light sequences and timings as buses approach.

, the system worked using 'bus detectors' mounted on lampposts and similar posts by the side of the road, which detect transmission made by transmitters aboard buses, developed as part of Transport for London's Countdown bus tracking system. TfL was, at that time, considering whether to use newer, GPS-based, bus location systems to supplant the existing beacon-based infrastructure.

, a new bus location system, Countdown II, was in the process of being commissioned.

See also 
 London iBus system

References

External links
 Bus priority at traffic signals keeps London's buses moving
 Siemens Selective Vehicle Detection
 Attitudes to bus priority schemes
 Review of bus priority at traffic signals around the world
 Attitudes to bus priority schemes – Research Summary

Traffic signals
Road transport in London
Bus transport in London
Road traffic management